Morley Hall may refer to:

Morleys Hall, moated hall, Morleys Lane, on the edge of Astley Moss in Astley, Greater Manchester
Morley Town Hall, Morley, West Yorkshire, England
Morley Old Hall, Norfolk